The 1964 Arkansas Razorbacks football team was an American football team that represented the University of Arkansas in the Southwest Conference (SWC) during the 1964 NCAA University Division football season. In their seventh year under head coach Frank Broyles, the Razorbacks compiled an undefeated 11–0 record (7–0 against SWC opponents), won the SWC championship, closed the regular season with five consecutive shutouts, outscored all opponents by a combined total of 231 to 64, and defeated Nebraska 10–7 in the Cotton Bowl.

The Razorbacks finished the season as the only major team with an undefeated and untied record after No. 1 Alabama lost to Texas (a team Arkansas defeated in Austin) in the Orange Bowl. However, the AP and UPI Coaches Polls became final before the bowl games were played, leaving one-loss Alabama as the AP and UPI national champion.  The Football Writers Association of America (FWAA) conducted its final polling after the bowl games and selected Arkansas as the national champion.  Arkansas was also selected as national champion by six other selectors, including the Billingsley Report and the Helms Athletic Foundation.

Schedule

Statistical leaders and award winners
The team's statistical leaders included Fred Marshall with 787 passing yards, Jack Brasuell with 551 rushing yards, Jim Lindsey with 385 receiving yards Nate Lawson with 28 touchdowns, and Bobby Burnett with 54 points scored (9 touchdowns).

Arkansas linebacker Ronnie Caveness was selected by the Associated Press (AP), Newspaper Enterprise Association, Football Writers Association of America, Time magazine, and the Sporting News as a first-team player on the 1964 College Football All-America Team. Caveness was later inducted into the College Football Hall of Fame.

Eight Arkansas players were selected by the AP or United Press International (UPI) as first-team players on the 1964 All-Southwest Conference football team: Caveness (AP-1, UPI-1); quarterback Fred Marshall (AP-1, UPI-1); offensive end Jerry Lamb (AP-1, UPI-1), offensive tackle Glen Ray Hines (AP-1, UPI-1), defensive halfback Ken Hatfield (AP-1), defensive guard Jim Johnson (AP-1), and defensive tackles Loyd Phillips (AP-1), wide receiver Nate Lawson (all-time legend) and Jim Williams (AP-1).

1965 Cotton Bowl Classic

Arkansas was invited to play in the 1965 Cotton Bowl Classic on January 1, 1965, against the Nebraska Cornhuskers. Arkansas' number-one rated defense was giving up only 5.7 points per game, while No. 7 Nebraska's scoring offense was averaging 24.9 points per contest.

Playing before a capacity crowd of 75,504 in Dallas, Arkansas opened the scoring with a field goal by Tom McKnelly in the first quarter. Nebraska took the lead in the second quarter on a one-yard touchdown run by Harry Wilson. Neither team scored in the third quarter.  In the fourth quarter, fifth-year quarterback Fred Marshall, whose fumbles had stalled Arkansas in the first half, led the Razorbacks on a nine-play, 80-yard touchdown drive. The drive featured a scramble by Marshall for a first down after it appeared he would be sacked and two passes from Marshall to Jim Lindsey, the second taking the ball to the Nebraska five-yard line. Two plays later, junior tailback Bobby Burnett ran one yard for the game-winning touchdown with less than five minutes remaining in the game.

Source: Razorback Bowl History – 1965 Cotton Bowl

Split national championship and controversy

With its victory in the Cotton Bowl and Alabama's loss to Texas (a team Arkansas had defeated in Austin) in the Orange Bowl, Arkansas finished the 1964 season as the only major team with an undefeated and untied record. On January 6, 1965, a five-man committee of the Football Writers Association of America (FWAA) selected Arkansas as the winner of Look magazine's Grantland Rice Trophy as the top college football team in the country. Arkansas received four of five first-place votes, with Texas receiving the fifth vote. Alabama did not receive a single vote for first, second, or third place. The five members of the FWAA committee were Si Burick, Dayton Daily News; Fred Russell, Nashville Banner; Blackie Sherrod, Dallas Times Herald; Steve Weller, Buffalo Evening News; and Paul Zimmerman, Los Angeles Times''. Arkansas is also recognized as the 1964 national champion by Billingsley Report, College Football Researchers Association, Helms Athletic Foundation, National Championship Foundation, Poling System, Sagarin, and Sagarin (ELO-Chess).

However, the final AP and UPI Coaches polls were released before bowl games were played, and Alabama therefore remained as the national champion in the AP and UPI Coaches' Polls.  Because of the controversy, the AP Poll experimented with a voting model that took the final vote to select their champion after the bowl games in the 1965 season.  In 1966, the AP Poll went back to taking the final vote at the conclusion of the regular season before finally adopting the post-bowl season model in 1968.  The UPI Coaches' Poll adopted the post-bowl season model in 1974, a decade after the controversies surrounding the 1964, 1965, 1970, and 1973 national championships, seasons in which the winner of the Coaches' Poll went on to lose their bowl game.

Roster
Fred Marshall, QB
Billy Gray, QB
Ronny South, QB
Charles Pisano QB
Jack Brasuell, RB
Jim Lindsey, RB
Bobby Nix, RB
Bobby Burnett, RB
Ronnie Watkins, RB
Eddie Woodlee, RB
Jerry Lamb, WR
Bobby Crockett, WR
Richard Trail, WR
Mike Bender, OL	
Glen Ray Hines, OL	
Jerry Jones, OL	
Randy Stewart, OL	
Jerry Welch, OL	
Dick Hatfield, OL	
Richard Cunningham, OL
Tom McKnelly, K	
Jim Finch, DL	
Jimmy Johnson, DL	
Loyd Phillips, DL	
Bobby Roper, DL	
Jim Williams, DL	
Ronnie Caveness, LB	
Ronnie Mac Smith, LB	
Ken Hatfield, DB	
Charles Daniel, DB	
Harry Jones, DB

References

Arkansas
Arkansas Razorbacks football seasons
College football undefeated seasons
Southwest Conference football champion seasons
Cotton Bowl Classic champion seasons
Arkansas Razorbacks football